Simon "Si" Ramo (May 7, 1913 – June 27, 2016) was an American engineer, businessman, and author. He led development of microwave and missile technology and is sometimes known as the father of the intercontinental ballistic missile (ICBM). He also developed General Electric's electron microscope. He played prominent roles in the formation of two Fortune 500 companies, Ramo-Wooldridge (TRW after 1958) and Bunker Ramo Corporation (now part of Honeywell).

Early years 
Ramo was born in Salt Lake City, Utah, the son of Clara (Trestman) and Benjamin Ramo. His father was a Polish Jewish immigrant and his mother was a Russian Jewish immigrant. He entered the University of Utah at the age of 16, where he joined Theta Tau Professional Engineering Fraternity and earned a B.S. in electrical engineering at the age of 20. By 1936, at the age of 23, he had earned dual PhD degrees from Caltech in physics and electrical engineering.

Career

General Electric 
From 1936 until 1946, he led electronics research at General Electric, where he accumulated 25 patents before the age of 30 and was cited as one of America's most outstanding young electrical engineers. He became globally recognized as a leader in microwave research and headed the development of GE's electron microscope.

Hughes Aircraft 
In 1946 he returned to California to become director of research for the electronics department of Hughes Aircraft, and his career became coupled with that of Dean Wooldridge. Together they formed a successful team for many years, with Wooldridge concentrating on investment and general business aspects while Ramo led research, development and engineering.

By 1948, Hughes had created its Aerospace Group to work with the newly created U.S. Air Force. Dr. Ramo became a Vice-President and the Group's Director of Operations. Ramo employed his skills in Systems Engineering to allow Hughes to deliver integrated RADAR and aircraft fire-control systems. He developed the air-to-air missile, creating the Falcon missile.

In 1953 Ramo and Dean Wooldridge left Hughes Aircraft and formed the Ramo-Wooldridge Corporation, later TRW Inc.

Ramo-Wooldridge Corporation (TRW Inc.) 
By 1953 Ramo and the Air Force had become increasingly frustrated with management problems at Hughes. Ramo and Wooldridge were particularly concerned when Howard Hughes avoided their attempts to discuss the problem. In September they jointly resigned, and within a week they formed the Ramo-Wooldridge Corporation  on September 16, 1953.

In October 1953 an Assistant Secretary of Defense, Trevor Gardner, created a committee to consider the future of guided missiles. This Strategic Missile Evaluation Committee (SMEC) was headed by John von Neumann and included both Ramo and Wooldridge. In four months, the committee produced their report and recommended that a crash program was needed to develop intercontinental ballistic missiles, and that such a program might enable the United States to overtake Russian developments by 1959 or 1960.

The Ramo-Wooldridge Corp. became the lead contractor for the resulting Air Force program. With Dr. Ramo as the driving scientific and engineering officer, they succeeded. In 1958, an Atlas rocket delivered a payload 5,000 miles downrange. The Atlas would go on to serve as the launch vehicle for NASA's Project Mercury orbital flights, starting with John Glenn in Friendship 7. USAF General Bernard Schriever, head of the ICBM program, described Ramo as "the architect of the Thor, Atlas, and Titan" rockets.

According to a July 30, 2002 article, Ramo's comments are legendary for capsulizing complex ideas into off-the-cuff witticisms.

During a series of key experiments of ballistic missiles in the 1950s at Cape Canaveral, Florida, at which Ramo and Air Force General Bernard Schriever were observers, test rockets kept blowing up on their launch pads. When one missile rose about 6 inches before toppling over and exploding, Ramo reportedly beamed and said: "Well, Benny, now that we know the thing can fly, all we have to do is improve its range a bit."

Ramo-Wooldridge merged with Thompson Products to become TRW Inc., and Simon Ramo became Vice-Chairman. In 1964, TRW and Martin Marietta formed the jointly owned Bunker Ramo Corporation with Ramo as President, which expanded into the computer and communications technology fields.

In January 2008, he joined the faculty of the University of Southern California's Viterbi School of Engineering as a presidential chair and professor of electrical engineering. Ramo is also a founding member of the National Academy of Engineering.

Awards, appointments and fellowships 
During his long and successful career, Ramo has received numerous awards and fellowships. He has been honored by the American Philosophical Society, the Institute of Electrical and Electronics Engineers (IEEE), the American Physical Society, and the American Academy of Arts and Sciences.

Ramo has served as an advisor to the United States government on science and technology. He has been a member of the National Science Board, the White House Council on Energy R&D, the Advisory Council to the Secretary of Commerce, the Advisory Council to the Secretary of State for Science and Foreign Affairs, and of many special advisory committees to the Defense Department and NASA.  President Gerald Ford appointed Ramo as co-chairman of a committee of distinguished scientists and engineers, requesting Ramo to list the science and technology issues most deserving of attention by the White House and to recommend actions.  Following this, Ramo was appointed by President Ford to be chairman of The President's Advisory Committee on Science and Technology, a position created by Congress to advise on how to ensure that science and technology matters receive proper attention at the White House.

In 1980, then-President-elect Ronald Reagan asked Ramo to assemble a transition task force to advise on executive branch appointments where science and technology background was desirable.  President Reagan subsequently invited Ramo to be a Science Adviser to the President of the Republic of China.  In that assignment, Ramo aided greatly Taiwan's development of a strong high-technology industry.

On February 23, 1983, Ramo was presented with the Presidential Medal of Freedom by President Reagan.

In 1982, the IEEE Board of Directors initiated the IEEE Simon Ramo Medal for exceptional achievement in systems engineering and systems science.

In 1988, Theta Tau Professional Engineering Fraternity inducted Simon Ramo, Lambda (Utah)'33, into its Alumni Hall of Fame.

In 2007, the Space Foundation awarded Ramo its highest honor, the General James E. Hill Lifetime Space Achievement Award.

In 2009, the Theta Tau Educational Foundation named an annual scholarship in his honor.

Additional awards:

 Founders Medal, Institute of Electrical and Electronics Engineers
 John Fritz Medal, American Association of Engineering Societies
 Medal of Honor, Electronic Industries Association
 Kagan Medal, Columbia University
 Henry Heald Award, Illinois Institute of Technology
 Annual Award, Harvard Business School
 Golden Plate Award, American Academy of Achievement
 Distinguished Service Medal, Armed Forces Communication and Electronics Association
 Delmer S. Fahrney Medal
 Aesculapian Award, UCLA School of Medicine
 Durand Medal, Institute of Aeronautics and Astronautics
 Space and Missile Pioneer Award, U.S. Air Force
 Pioneer Award, International Council on Systems Engineering
 Howard Hughes Memorial Award
 Distinguished Alumnus Award, University of Utah
 National Trophy for Lifetime Achievement, Smithsonian Institution
 NASA Distinguished Public Service Medal
 University of Southern California Presidential Medallion
 Space Foundation General James E. Hill Lifetime Space Achievement Award
 Junior Achievement U.S. Business Hall of Fame inductee

Ramo has received numerous patents including one at age 100 concerning the use of technology in education making him the oldest American to be awarded a U.S. patent.

Publications 
Ramo has authored dozens of books on topics ranging from science textbooks, corporate and technology management, society's relation to technology, economy, and how to play tennis. A selection:

 Fields and Waves in Modern Radio by Simon Ramo and John R. Whinnery (1944)
 Introduction to Microwaves (1945)
 Peacetime Uses of Space (1959, 1977)
 Fields and Waves in Communication Electronics (1965) 
 Extraordinary Tennis For The Ordinary Player (1970)
 The Islands of E, Cono & My (1973) 
 America's Technology Slip (1980)
 The Management of Innovative Technological Corporations (1980) 
 What's Wrong with Our Technological Society—and How to Fix it (1983)
 Tennis By Machiavelli (1984)
 The Business of Science: Winning and Losing in the High-Tech Age (1988) 
 Meetings, Meetings, and More Meetings: Getting Things Done When People Are Involved (2005) 
 Strategic Business Forecasting: A Structured Approach to Shaping the Future of Your Business by Dr. Simon Ramo and Dr. Ronald Sugar (2009) 
 Tales from the Top: How CEOs Act and React (2011) 
 To Wit: A Sense of Humor - A Mandatory Tool of Management (2011) 
 Let Robots do the Dying (2011) 
 Guided Missile Engineering: University of California Engineering Extension Series by Allen E. Puckett and Simon Ramo (2013)

About Simon Ramo
 Stephen B. Johnson; The Secret of Apollo: Systems Management in American and European Space Programs 2002, The Johns Hopkins University Press.
 Davis Dyer; TRW: Pioneering Technology and Innovation since 1900 1998, Harvard Business School Press.
 G. Harry Stine; ICBM 1991, Orion Books.
 Ernest Schwiebert; History of the U.S. Air Force Ballistic Missiles 1965, Praeger Publishers.

Personal life 

Ramo was married to Virginia (née Smith) from 1937 until her death in 2009. They have two sons, James Brian and Alan Martin, four grandchildren and three great-grandchildren. Ramo died on June 27, 2016 at the age of 103.

References

External links

Biographic sketch at IEEE website
List of Founding Members of National Academy of Engineering
Biographical sketch by the International Council on Systems Engineering
Remarks at the Presentation Ceremony for the Presidential Medal of Freedom
Interview with Simon Ramo recorded in 1989

1913 births
2016 deaths
Businesspeople from Salt Lake City
American centenarians
American electrical engineers
American physicists
American people of Polish-Jewish descent
American people of Russian-Jewish descent
California Institute of Technology trustees
California Institute of Technology alumni
Founding members of the United States National Academy of Engineering
Members of the United States National Academy of Sciences
Men centenarians
National Medal of Science laureates
Rocket scientists
Systems engineers
TRW Inc.
University of Southern California faculty
University of Utah alumni
Presidential Medal of Freedom recipients
Scientists from Salt Lake City
20th-century American businesspeople